Dean Byrne (born 21 October 1981) is an Australian former professional rugby league footballer who played in the 2000s, he played in the National Rugby League (NRL) for the St. George Illawarra Dragons and South Sydney Rabbitohs.

A product of the Peakhurst Hawks, Byrne's career was curtailed by a serious leg injury that forced his premature retirement in 2004.
Byrne has played Oztag at representative level, and has been picked to represent Australia on many occasions.

References

1981 births
Australian rugby league players
St. George Illawarra Dragons players
South Sydney Rabbitohs players
Living people
Rugby league halfbacks
Rugby league five-eighths
Rugby league players from Sydney